EB/Streymur/Skála is a Faroese women's football team based in Skála and Streymnes. The team is the result of a cooperation between the women's football departments of EB/Streymur and Skála ÍF. They won the 1. deild kvinnur for the first time in 2017, ending KÍ's run of 17 consecutive titles.

History
Before the 2013 season, Skála and EB/Streymur, which finished 5th and 6th, respectively, in the previous season (contested by 10 clubs), unified their women's teams, aiming to compete for the title against the dominant KÍ. Skála was a considerable force in Faroese women's football in the early 1990s, having won the 1. deild kvinnur twice and the Faroese Women's Cup once. EB/Streymur was less successful, having reached only a Cup final in 2004, in which they ended up thrashed by KÍ.

The team had a strong first season, handing KÍ their first loss in nearly four years, and finishing as runners-up only four points behind them. EBS/Skála finished as runners-up for the next three seasons, finally ending the Klaksvík club's streak of 17 consecutive titles in 2017. In the same year they won the Cup for the first time and defended both titles in 2018.

Current squad
As of 4 May 2020.

Honours
1. deild kvinnur
Winners: 2017, 2018
Runners-up: 2013, 2014, 2015, 2016

Faroese Women's Cup
Winners: 2017, 2018
Runners-up: 2015

European record

(H) = host

References

External links

Women's football clubs in the Faroe Islands